The South Carolina League was a minor league baseball league that played from 1906 to 1908. The Class D level South Carolina League consisted entirely of franchises based in South Carolina for its three seasons of play. The Sumter Gamecocks won league championships in 1907 and 1908.

History
The South Carolina League formed for the first time in the 1906 season as a six–team Class D level minor league. The 1906 charter league member teams were Camden, the Darlington Fiddlers, Georgetown, Manning, the Orangeburg Cotton Pickers and Sumter Gamecocks. The final 1906 South Carolina League records and standings are unknown.

In 1907, the Class D level South Carolina League continued as a six–team league under league president Mendel L. Smith, beginning play on May 20, 1907. The league added the Anderson Electricians, Greenville Mountaineers and Spartanburg Spartans as new franchises. On July 27, 1907, Darlington moved to Florence and the Anderson and Greenville franchises both folded. Completing the 1907 season with four teams, the Sumter Game Cocks won the league championship with a 44–23 record. Sumner finished ahead of the Orangeburg Cotton Pickers (42–25), Spartanburg Spartans (36–24) and Darlington/Florence Fiddlers (23–45) in the standings and were champions as the league held no playoffs.

In 1908, the South Carolina League played their final season as a four–team Class D level league, beginning play on May 4, 1908. The Sumter Gamecocks defended their title, posting a 41–27 regular season record, as the league held no playoffs. Sumter was followed by the Chester Collegians (40–30), Rock Hill Catawbas (28–40) and Orangeburg Edistoes (27–39). The South Carolina permanently folded following the 1908 season.

South Carolina League teams

Standings & statistics

1906 to 1908
1906 South Carolina League
Standings and statistics not available

1907 South Carolina League

 

1908 South Carolina League

References

Defunct minor baseball leagues in the United States
Baseball leagues in South Carolina
Sports leagues established in 1906
Sports leagues disestablished in 1908
1906 establishments in South Carolina
1908 disestablishments in South Carolina